The 2014–15 Ukrainian Premier League Reserves and Under 19 season are competitions between the reserves of Ukrainian Premier League Clubs and the Under 19s. The events in the senior leagues during the 2013–14 season saw Tavriya Simferopol Reserves relegated with Arsenal Kyiv Reserves and Sevastopol Reserves expelled and Olimpik Reserves entering the competition.

Managers

Final standings

Top scorers

See also
2014-15 Ukrainian Premier League

References

Reserves
Ukrainian Premier Reserve League seasons